Jeyaratnam Thiviyanathan (born 20 April 1952) is a Sri Lankan Tamil politician and former Member of Parliament.

Thiviyanathan was born on 20 April 1952. He was educated at Jaffna Central College. He is a Roman Catholic.

Thiviyanathan contested the 1989 parliamentary election as one of the Eelam People's Revolutionary Liberation Front's candidates in Ampara District and was elected to Parliament.

References

1952 births
Alumni of Jaffna Central College
Eelam People's Revolutionary Liberation Front politicians
Living people
Members of the 9th Parliament of Sri Lanka
People from Eastern Province, Sri Lanka
Sri Lankan Roman Catholics
Sri Lankan Tamil politicians